The Koue Bokkeveld, meaning "Cold Buck Shrubland" in Afrikaans, is a mountain range in the Western Cape Province, South Africa. Geologically the range is composed of Cedarberg Sandstone of the Cape System.

Location and extent
It is located above Prince Alfred Hamlet, north of Ceres, and south and east of Citrusdal. The range runs in a WNW-ESE direction with a tall escarpment on its southern and southwestern side. Elevations of the range are an average of 1,600 m and there is often snow in winter. These heights are one of the coldest places in the Western Cape in winter.

Drainage
The Koue Bokkeveld falls within the Olifants/Doring system and the Doring River has its sources in this range, contributing substantially to the flow of the Olifants catchment area.

Ecology
The flora of the Koue Bokkeveld is similar to the Cedarberg flora, with mountain fynbos at high altitudes, Karoo vegetation on the lower slopes and patches of Mountain cypress. Plants such as the oil bract conebush, a species of Leucadendron, may be found.

Artifacts
There are ancient San rock paintings at a place called Katbakkies. A meteorite crashed on the Koue Bokkeveld in 1838. It is known as the Koue Bokkeveld or CM2 meteorite. Its fragments were dispersed and now most of them have been lost.

See also
 List of mountain ranges of South Africa

References

External links
Koue Bokkeveld Op-die-Berg Household Rainwater Harvesting
ZA080 Cedarberg - Koue Bokkeveld complex

Mountain ranges of the Western Cape